A main battle tank (MBT), also known as a battle tank or universal tank, is a tank that fills the role of armor-protected direct fire and maneuver in many modern armies. Cold War-era development of more powerful engines, better suspension systems and lighter composite armor allowed for the design of a tank that had the firepower of a super-heavy tank, the armor protection of a heavy tank, and the mobility of a light tank, in a package with the weight of a medium tank. Through the 1960s and 1970s, the MBT replaced almost all other types of tanks, leaving only some specialist roles to be filled by lighter designs or other types of armored fighting vehicles.

Main battle tanks are a key component of modern armies. Modern MBTs seldom operate alone, as they are organized into armoured units that include the support of infantry, who may accompany the tanks in infantry fighting vehicles. They are also often supported by surveillance or ground-attack aircraft. The average weight of MBTs varies from country to country.  The average weight of Western MBTs is usually greater than that of Russian or Chinese MBTs.

History

Initial limited-role tank classes

During World War I, combining tracks, armor, and guns into a functional vehicle pushed the limits of mechanical technology. This limited the specific battlefield capabilities any one tank design could be expected to fulfill. A design might have good speed, armour, or firepower, but not all three together.

Facing the deadlock of trench warfare, the first tank designs focused on crossing wide trenches, requiring very long and large vehicles, such as the British Mark I tank and successors; these became known as heavy tanks. Tanks that focused on other combat roles were smaller, like the French Renault FT; these were light tanks or tankettes. Many late-war and inter-war tank designs diverged from these according to new, and mostly untried, concepts for future tank roles and tactics. Each nation tended to create its own list of tank classes with different intended roles, such as "cavalry tanks", "breakthrough tanks", "fast tanks", and "assault tanks". The British maintained cruiser tanks that traded armour for speed and hence manoeuvrability in the attack, and infantry tanks that traded speed for more armour.

Evolution of the general-purpose medium tank

After years of isolated and divergent development, the various interwar tank concepts were finally tested with the start of World War II. In the chaos of blitzkrieg, tanks designed for a single role often found themselves forced into battlefield situations they were ill-suited for. During the war, limited-role tank designs tended to be replaced by more general-purpose designs, enabled by improving tank technology. Tank classes became mostly based on weight (and the corresponding transport and logistical needs). This led to new definitions of heavy and light tank classes, with medium tanks covering the balance of those between. The German Panzer IV tank, designed before the war as a "heavy" tank for assaulting fixed positions, was redesigned during the war with armour and gun upgrades to allow it to take on anti-tank roles as well, and was reclassified as a medium tank.

The second half of World War II saw an increased reliance on general-purpose medium tanks, which became the bulk of the tank combat forces. Generally, these designs massed about 25–30 tonnes, were armed with cannons around 75 mm, and powered by engines in the 400 to 500 hp range. Notable examples include the Soviet T-34 (the most-produced tank to that time) and the US M4 Sherman.

Late war tank development placed increased emphasis on armour, armament, and anti-tank capabilities for medium tanks:

The German Panther tank, designed to counter the Soviet T-34, had both armament and armour increased over previous medium tanks. Unlike previous Panzer designs, its frontal armor was sloped for increased effectiveness. It also was equipped with the high-velocity long-barreled 75 mm KwK 42 L/70 gun that was able to defeat the armor of all but the heaviest Allied tank at long range. The powerful Maybach HL230 P30 engine and robust running gear meant that even though the Panther tipped the scales at 50 tons – sizeable for its day – it was actually quite maneuverable, offering better off-road speed than the Panzer IV. However, its rushed development led to reliability and maintenance issues.
The Soviet T-44 incorporated many of the lessons learned with the extensive use of the T-34 model, and some of those modifications were used in the first MBTs, like a modern torsion suspension, instead of the Christie suspension version of the T-34, and a transversally mounted engine that simplified its gearbox. It is also seen as direct predecessor of the T-54, as the T-44 was the first Soviet tank with a suspension sturdy enough to be able to mount a 100 mm cannon.
The American M26 Pershing, a medium tank  of 40 tons to replace the M4 Sherman, innovated in US tanks many features common on post-war MBTs. These features include an automatic transmission mounted in the rear, torsion bar suspension and had an early form of a powerpack, combining an engine and transmission into a compact package. The M26, however, suffered from a relatively weak engine for its weight, and as a result was somewhat underpowered. The design of the M26 had profound influence on American postwar medium and main battle tanks: "The M26 formed the basis for the postwar generation of U.S. battle tanks from the M46 through the M47, M48, and M60 series."

British universal tank

Britain had continued on the path of parallel development of cruiser tanks and infantry tanks. Development of the Rolls-Royce Meteor engine for the Cromwell tank, combined with efficiency savings elsewhere in the design, almost doubled the horsepower for cruiser tanks. This led to speculation of a "Universal Tank", able to take on the roles of both a cruiser and an infantry tank by combining heavy armour and manoeuvrability.

Field Marshal Bernard Montgomery is acknowledged as the main advocate of the British universal tank concept as early as 1943, according to the writings of Giffard Le Quesne Martel, but little progress was made beyond development of the basic Cromwell cruiser tank that eventually led to the Centurion. The Centurion was designed for mobility and firepower at the expense of armour, but more engine power permitted more armour protection, so the Centurion could also operate as an infantry tank, doing so well that development of a new universal tank was rendered unnecessary.

The Centurion, entering service just as World War II finished, was a multi-role tank that subsequently formed the main armoured element of the British Army of the Rhine, the armed forces of the British Empire and Commonwealth forces, and subsequently many other nations through exports, whose cost was met largely by the US.  The introduction of the 84 mm 20-pounder gun in 1948 gave the tank a significant advantage over other tanks of the era, paving the way for a new tank classification, the main battle tank, which gradually superseded previous weight and armament classes.

Cold War
A surplus of effective WWII-era designs in other forces, notably the US and the Soviet Union, led to slower introductions of similar designs on their part. By the early 1950s, these designs were clearly no longer competitive, especially in a world of shaped charge weapons, and new designs rapidly emerged from most armed forces.

The concept of the medium tank gradually evolved into the MBT in the 1960s, as it was realized that medium tanks could carry guns (such as the US 90 mm, Soviet 100 mm, and especially the British L7 105 mm) that could penetrate any practical level of armour then existing at long range. Also, the heaviest tanks were unable to use most existing bridges. The World War II concept of heavy tanks, armed with the most powerful guns and heaviest armour, became obsolete because the large tanks were too expensive and just as vulnerable to damage by mines, bombs, rockets, and artillery. Likewise, World War II had shown that lightly armed and armoured tanks were of limited value in most roles. Even reconnaissance vehicles had shown a trend towards heavier weight and greater firepower during World War II; speed was not a substitute for armour and firepower.

An increasing variety of anti-tank weapons and the perceived threat of a nuclear war prioritized the need for additional armour. The additional armour prompted the design of even more powerful guns. The main battle tank thus took on the role the British had once called the "universal tank", exemplified by the Centurion, filling almost all battlefield roles. Typical main battle tanks were as well armed as any other vehicle on the battlefield, highly mobile, and well armoured. Yet they were cheap enough to be built in large numbers. The first Soviet main battle tank was the T-64 (the T-54/55 and T-62 were considered "medium" tanks) and the first American nomenclature-designated MBT was the M60 tank.

Anti-tank weapons rapidly outpaced armour developments. By the 1960s anti-tank rounds could penetrate a meter of steel so as to make the application of traditional rolled homogeneous armour unpragmatic. The first solution to this problem was the composite armor of Soviet T-64 tank, which included steel-glass-reinforced textolite-steel sandwich in heavily sloped glacis plates, and steel turret with aluminum inserts, which helped to resist both high-explosive anti-tank (HEAT) and APDS shells of the era. Later came British Chobham armour. This composite armour used layers of ceramics and other materials to help attenuate the effects of HEAT munitions. Another threat came by way of the widespread use of helicopters in battle. Before the advent of helicopters, armour was heavily concentrated to the front of the tank. This new threat caused designs to distribute armour on all sides of the tank (also having the effect of protecting the vehicle's occupants from nuclear explosion radiation).

By the late 1970s, MBTs were manufactured by China, France, West Germany, Britain, India, Italy, Japan, the Soviet Union, Sweden, Switzerland, and the United States.

The Soviet Union's war doctrine depended heavily on the main battle tank. Any weapon advancement making the MBT obsolete could have devastated the Soviet Union's fighting capability. The Soviet Union made novel advancements to the weapon systems including mechanical autoloaders and anti-tank guided missiles. Autoloaders were introduced to replace the human loader, permitting the turret to be reduced in size, making the tank smaller and less visible as a target, while missile systems were added to extend the range at which a vehicle could engage a target and thereby enhance the first-round hit probability.

The United States's experience in the Vietnam War contributed to the idea among army leadership that the role of the main battle tank could be fulfilled by attack helicopters. During the Vietnam War, helicopters and missiles competed with MBTs for research money.

Though the Persian Gulf War reaffirmed the role of main battle tanks, MBTs were outperformed by the attack helicopter. Other strategists considered that the MBT was entirely obsolete in light of the efficacy and speed with which coalition forces neutralized Iraqi armour.

Asymmetrical warfare

In asymmetric warfare, threats such as improvised explosive devices and mines have proven effective against MBTs. In response, nations that face asymmetric warfare, such as Israel, are reducing the size of their tank fleet and procuring more advanced models. Conversely, some insurgent groups like Hezbollah themselves operate main battle tanks, such as the T-72.

The United States Army used 1,100 M1 Abrams in the course of the Iraq War. They proved to have an unexpectedly high vulnerability to improvised explosive devices. A relatively new type of remotely detonated mine, the explosively formed penetrator, was used with some success against American armoured vehicles. However, with upgrades to their rear armour, M1s proved to be valuable in urban combat; at the Second Battle of Fallujah the United States Marines brought in two extra companies of M1s. Britain deployed its Challenger 2 tanks to support its operations in southern Iraq.

Advanced armour has reduced crew fatalities but has not improved vehicle survivability. Small unmanned turrets on top of the cupolas called remote controlled weapon stations armed with machine guns or mortars provide improved defence and enhance crew survivability. Experimental tanks with unmanned turrets locate crew members in the heavily armoured hull, improving survivability and reducing the vehicle's profile.

Technology is reducing the weight and size of the modern MBT. A British military document from 2001 indicated that the British Army would not procure a replacement for the Challenger 2 because of a lack of conventional warfare threats in the foreseeable future. The obsolescence of the tank has been asserted, but the history of the late 20th and early 21st century suggested that MBTs were still necessary.

Design
The Organization for Security and Co-operation in Europe defines a main battle tank as "a self-propelled armoured fighting vehicle, capable of heavy firepower, primarily of a high muzzle velocity direct fire main gun necessary to engage armoured and other targets, with high cross-country mobility, with a high level of self-protection, and which is not designed and equipped primarily to transport combat troops."

Overview

Countermeasures

Originally, most MBTs relied on steel armour to defend against various threats. As newer threats emerged, however, the defensive systems used by MBTs had to evolve to counter them. One of the first new developments was the use of explosive reactive armour (ERA), developed by Israel in the early 1980s to defend against the shaped-charge warheads of modern anti-tank guided missiles and other such high-explosive anti-tank (HEAT) projectiles. This technology was subsequently adopted and expanded upon by the United States and the Soviet Union.

Missiles are cheap and cost-effective anti-tank weapons. ERA can be quickly added to vehicles to increase their survivability. However, the detonation of ERA blocks creates a hazard to any supporting infantry near the tank. Despite this drawback, it is still employed on many Russian MBTs, the latest generation Kontakt-5 being capable of defeating both HEAT and kinetic energy penetrator threats. The Soviets also developed Active Protection Systems (APS) designed to more actively neutralize hostile projectiles before they could even strike the tank, namely the Shtora and Arena systems. The United States has also adopted similar technologies in the form of the Missile Countermeasure Device and as part of the Tank Urban Survival Kit used on M1 Abrams tanks serving in Iraq. The latest Russian MBT, according to many forum members the T-14 Armata, incorporates an AESA radar as part of its Afghanit APS and in conjunction with the rest of its armament, can also intercept aircraft and missiles.

MBTs can also be protected from radar detection by incorporating stealth technology. The T-14 Armata has a turret designed to be harder to detect with radars and thermal sights. Advanced camouflage, like the Russian Nakidka, will also reduce the radar and thermal signatures of a MBT.

Other defensive developments focused on improving the strength of the armour itself; one of the notable advancements coming from the British with the development of Chobham armour in the 1970s. It was first employed on the American M1 Abrams and later the British Challenger 1. Chobham armour uses a lattice of composite and ceramic materials along with metal alloys to defeat incoming threats, and proved highly effective in the conflicts in Iraq in the early 1990s and 2000s; surviving numerous impacts from 1950–60s–era rocket-propelled grenades with negligible damage. It is much less efficient against later models of RPGs. For example, the RPG-29 from the 1980s is able to penetrate the frontal hull armour of the Challenger 2.

Weaponry

Main battle tanks are equipped with a main tank gun, and at least one machine gun.

MBT main guns are generally between 100 and 125 mm caliber, and can fire both anti-armour and, more recently, anti-personnel rounds. The cannon serves a dual role, able to engage other armoured targets such as tanks and fortifications, and soft targets such as light vehicles and infantry. It is fixed to the turret, along with the loading and fire mechanism. Modern tanks use a sophisticated fire-control system, including rangefinders, computerized fire control, and stabilizers, which are designed to keep the cannon stable and aimed even if the hull is turning or shaking, making it easier for the operators to fire on the move and/or against moving targets. Gun-missile systems are complicated and have been particularly unsatisfactory to the United States who abandoned gun-missile projects such as the M60A2 and MBT-70, but have been diligently developed by the Soviet Union, who even retrofitted them to T-55 tanks, in an effort to double the effective range of the vehicle's fire. The MBT's role could be compromised because of the increasing distances involved and the increased reliance on indirect fire. The tank gun is still useful in urban combat for precisely delivering powerful fire while minimizing collateral damage.

High-explosive anti-tank (HEAT), and some form of high velocity kinetic energy penetrator, such as armour-piercing fin-stabilized discarding sabot (APFSDS) rounds are carried for anti-armour purposes. Anti-personnel rounds such as high explosive or high explosive fragmentation have dual purpose. Less common rounds are Beehive anti-personnel rounds, and high-explosive squash head (HESH) rounds used for both anti-armour and bunker busting. Usually, an MBT carries 30–50 rounds of ammunition for its main gun, usually split between HE, HEAT and kinetic energy penetrator rounds. Some MBTs may also carry smoke or white phosphorus rounds. Some MBTs are equipped with an autoloader, such as the French Leclerc, or the Russian/Ukrainian T-64, T-72, T-80, T-84, T-90, and T-14 and, for this reason, the crew can be reduced to 3 members. MBTs with an autoloader require one less crew member and the autoloader requires less space than its human counterpart, allowing for a reduction in turret size. Further, an autoloader can be designed to handle rounds which would be too difficult for a human to load. This reduces the silhouette which improves the MBT's target profile. However, with a manual loader, the rounds can be isolated within a blowout chamber, rather than a magazine within the turret, which could improve crew survivability. However, the force of a modern depleted uranium armour piercing fin stabilised discarding sabot round at the muzzle can exceed 6000 kN (a rough estimate, considering a uranium 60 cm/2 cm rod, 19g/cm3, @ 1,750 m/s). Composite+reactive armour could withstand this kind of force through its deflection and deformation, but with a second hit in the same area, an armour breach is inevitable. As such, the speed of follow up shots is crucial within tank to tank combat.

As secondary weapons, an MBT usually uses between two and four machine guns to engage infantry and light vehicles. Many MBTs mount one heavy caliber anti-aircraft machine gun (AAMG), usually of .50 caliber (like the M2 Browning or DShK), which can be used against helicopters and low flying aircraft. However, their effectiveness is limited in comparison to dedicated anti-aircraft artillery. The tank's machine guns are usually equipped with between 500 and 3000 rounds each.

Situational awareness

 
Performing situational awareness and communicating is one of four primary MBT functions. For situational awareness, the crew can use a circular review system combining augmented reality and artificial Intelligence technologies. These systems use several externally mounted video sensors to transfer a 360º view of the tank's surroundings onto crew helmet-mounted displays or other display systems.

Mobility

MBTs, like previous models of tanks, move on continuous tracks, which allow a decent level of mobility over most terrain including sand and mud. They also allow tanks to climb over most obstacles. MBTs can be made water-tight, so they can even dive into shallow water ( with snorkel). The extreme weight of vehicles of this type (40–70 tons) also limits their speed. They are usually equipped with a  engine (more than ), with an operational range near .

The German Army has prioritized mobility in its Leopard 2 which is considered one of the fastest MBTs in existence.

The MBT is often cumbersome in traffic and frequently obstructs the normal flow of traffic. The tracks can damage some roads after repeated use. Many structures like bridges do not have the load capacity to support an MBT. In the fast pace of combat, it is often impossible to test the sturdiness of these structures. Though appreciated for its excellent off-road characteristics, the MBT can become immobilized in muddy conditions.

The high cost of MBTs can be attributed in part to the high-performance engine-transmission system and to the fire control system. Also, propulsion systems are not produced in high enough quantities to take advantage of economies of scale.

Crew fatigue limits the operational range of MBTs in combat. Reducing the crew to three and relocating all crewmembers from the turret to the hull could provide time to sleep for one off-shift crewmember located in the rear of the hull. In this scenario, crewmembers would rotate shifts regularly and all would require cross-training on all vehicle job functions.
Cargo aircraft are instrumental to the timely deployment of MBTs. The absence of sufficient numbers of strategic airlift assets can limit the rate of MBT deployments to the number of aircraft available.

Military planners anticipate that the airlift capability for MBTs will not improve in the future. To date, no helicopter has the capability to lift MBTs. Rail and road are heavily used to move MBTs nearer to the battle, ready to fight in prime condition. Where well maintained roads allow it, wheeled tank transporters can be used.

The difficult task of resupply is usually accomplished with large trucks.

Storage
Main battle tanks have internal and external storage space. Internal space is reserved for ammunition. External space enhances independence of logistics and can accommodate extra fuel and some personal equipment of the crew.

The Israeli Merkava can even accommodate crew members displaced from a destroyed vehicle in its ammunition compartment.

Crew

Emphasis is placed on selecting and training main battle tank crew members. The crew must perform their tasks faultlessly and harmoniously so commanders select teams taking into consideration personalities and talents.

Role

The main battle tank fulfills the role the British had once called the "universal tank", filling almost all battlefield roles. They were originally designed in the Cold War to combat other MBTs. The modern light tank supplements the MBT in expeditionary roles and situations where all major threats have been neutralized and excess weight in armour and armament would only hinder mobility and cost more money to operate.

Reconnaissance by MBTs is performed in high-intensity conflicts where reconnaissance by light vehicles would be insufficient due to the necessity to "fight" for information.

In asymmetric warfare, main battle tanks are deployed in small, highly concentrated units. MBTs fire only at targets at close range and instead rely on external support such as unmanned aircraft for long range combat.

Main battle tanks have significantly varied characteristics. Procuring too many varieties can place a burden on tactics, training, support and maintenance.

The MBT has a positive morale effect on the infantry it accompanies. It also instills fear in the opposing force who can often hear and even feel their arrival.

Procurement

Manufacture
MBT production is increasingly being outsourced to wealthy nations. Countries that are just beginning to produce tanks are having difficulties remaining profitable in an industry that is increasingly becoming more expensive through the sophistication of technology. Even some large-scale producers are seeing declines in production. Even China is divesting many of its MBTs.

The production of main battle tanks is limited to manufacturers that specialize in combat vehicles. Commercial manufacturers of civilian vehicles cannot easily be repurposed as MBT production facilities.

Prices for MBTs have more than tripled from 1943 to 2011, although this pales in comparison with the price increase in fighter aircraft from 1943 to 1975.

Marketing

Several MBT models, such as the AMX-40 and OF-40, were marketed almost solely as export vehicles. Several tank producers, such as Japan and Israel, choose not to market their creations for export. Others have export control laws in place.

See also

 Armoured warfare
 List of U.S. military vehicles by model number
 List of main battle tanks by country
 List of main battle tanks by generation
 Cold War Tanks
 Post-Cold War Tanks

References

External links 
 

 
Tanks by type